Suzanne Doris Berger (born 1939) is an American political scientist. She is the Raphael Dorman and Helen Starbuck Professor of Political Science at the Massachusetts Institute of Technology (MIT) and director of the MIT International Science and Technology Initiative. A leading authority in comparative politics and political economy, she has pointed to the centrality of politics in mediating and redirecting ostensibly transcendent forces, such as economic modernization and globalization.

Education
She attended Antioch College for two years before transferring to the University of Chicago where she received her B.A. with honors in 1960. She then studied at Harvard University where she received both an M.A. and Ph.D.

Career
Berger joined the faculty at the Massachusetts Institute of Technology (MIT) in 1968. She published her first book, Peasants against Politics, in 1972, which included articles related to French politics in light of industrialization. During her time at MIT, she was elected a Fellow of the American Academy of Arts and Sciences in 1978. By 1995, she was elected Director of MIT's International Science and Technology Initiative and appointed the Raphael Dorman and Helen Starbuck Professor. She also developed a new subject called "Globalization" to be taught in the political science department.

During the 2002–03 academic year, she received the Dean's Award for Distinguished Service to the School of Humanities, Arts, and Social Science. In her 2005 book How We Compete, based on a five-year study by the MIT Industrial Performance Center, she presents the result of case studies of over 500 international companies to discover which practices are succeeding in today’s global economy, which are failing, and why. She paints a far more complicated picture than the black-and-white presentations by most promoters and opponents of globalization. Cheap labor is not the answer, offshoring is not a fatality, and the avenues open to companies are much wider than is generally imagined.  She was appointed chevalier of France's Légion d'Honneur in 2009.

Berger was a member of the MIT Commission on Industrial Productivity, whose report, Made in America, analyzed weaknesses and strengths in U.S. industry in the 1980s. She is also a Research Associate and member of the Committee of the Minda de Gunzburg Center for European Studies at Harvard University.

She served as Vice President of the American Political Science Association and as founding Chair of the Social Science Research Council Joint Committee on Western Europe. She is the former chair of the Political Science department at MIT. In addition to heading the MIT International Science and Technology Initiative, she is also the founder and director of the MIT-France Program there.

In 2019, Berger was appointed the inaugural John M. Deutch Institute Professor, the highest faculty honor at MIT.

Works 

 Peasants Against Politics: Rural Organization in Brittany, 1911-1967. Cambridge, Massachusetts: Harvard University Press, 1972
 French updated version: Les Paysans contre la politique. Paris: Seuil, 1975
 The French Political System. New York: Random House, 1974
 The Utilization of the Social Sciences in Policy Making in the United States (editor). Paris: OECD, 1980
 Dualism and Discontinuity in Industrial Societies (with Michael Piore). New York: Cambridge University Press, 1980
 Italian version: Dualismo economico e politica nelle società industriali. Bologna: Il Mulino, 1982
 Organizing Interests in Western Europe (editor, with introductory chapter and one other chapter). New York: Cambridge University Press, 1981
 Italian version: L’organizzazione degli interessi nell’Europa occidentale. Bologna: Il Mulino, 1983
 Spanish version: La organización de los grupos de interés en Europa Occidental. Madrid: Ministerio de Trabajo y Seguiridad Social, 1988
 Religion and Politics in Western Europe (editor). London: Frank Cass, 1982
 Made in America: Regaining the Productive Edge, (coauthor). Cambridge, MA, MIT Press, 1989
 National Diversity and Global Capitalism (editor, with Ronald Dore). Ithaca: Cornell University Press, 1996
 Italian version with new introduction: Differenze nazionali e capitalismo globale (Bologna: Il Mulino, 1998)
 Made by Hong Kong (with Richard K. Lester), Hong Kong: Oxford University Press, 1997
 Notre Première Mondialisation: Leçons d’un échec oublié, Paris: Seuil, 2003, 
 Global Taiwan (editor, with Richard K. Lester), M.E. Sharpe, 2005
 How We Compete: What Companies Around the World Are Doing to Make It in the Global Economy. New York: Doubleday, 2005
 French version with new foreword: Made in Monde (Paris, Seuil, 2006),

References

External links 
 Professor Berger Profile, MIT
 Présentation Suzanne Berger

1939 births
American women political scientists
American political scientists
Fellows of the American Academy of Arts and Sciences
Harvard University alumni
International relations scholars
Living people
MIT School of Humanities, Arts, and Social Sciences faculty
University of Chicago alumni
Antioch College alumni
People from Boston
Social Science Research Council
21st-century American women